Meisel or Meisels is a surname. Notable people with the surname include:

Dow Ber Meisels (1798–1870), Polish Orthodox rabbi
Edmund Meisel, German composer
Elazar Meisels, an American Orthodox rabbi
Hilde Meisel, (1914–1945), German Resistance fighter and writer
John Meisel, (born 1923), Canadian political scientist, professor, and scholar
Mordecai Meisel, (1528—1601), philanthropist and communal leader in Prague
Samuel J. Meisels (born 1945), American expert on early childhood assessment and child development
Steven Meisel (fashion photographer) Vogue
Tamar Meisels, Israeli political theorist
Wilhelm Meisel, (1891–1974), German admiral during World War II

See also 

 Meisel family

Jewish surnames